Antsakoamaro is a town and commune in Madagascar. It belongs to the district of Bekily, which is a part of Androy Region. The population of the commune was estimated to be approximately 5,000 in 2001 commune census.

Only primary schooling is available. The majority 90% of the population of the commune are farmers, while an additional 9.5% receives their livelihood from raising livestock. The most important crop is peanuts, while other important products are cassava and rice. Services provide employment for 0.5% of the population.

References and notes 

Populated places in Androy